Alucheh-ye Fuladlu (also Romanized as Ālūcheh-ye Fūlādlū; also known as Ālūcheh) is a village in Fuladlui Shomali Rural District, Hir District, Ardabil County, Ardabil Province, Iran. At the 2006 census, its population was 336, in 79 families.

References 

Towns and villages in Ardabil County